Basilio Arturo Ignacio Lami Dozo (1 February 1929 – 1 February 2017) was a member of the Argentine Air Force. He participated in the military dictatorship known as the National Reorganisation Process (1976–1983) and, along with Leopoldo Fortunato Galtieri and Jorge Isaac Anaya, was a member of the Third Military Junta that ruled Argentina between 1981 and 1982. Alongside Reynaldo Bignone and Omar Graffigna he was one of the last surviving members of the dictatorship.

In the 1985 Trial of the Juntas, he was charged with, and acquitted of, acts of torture, making false declarations, and kidnappings.

In 1989, he was sentenced to an eight-year prison term in the criminal proceedings that arose from the 1982 Falklands War, in which he had served as commander-in-chief of the Air Force. In 1990 he received a presidential pardon from Carlos Menem and was allowed to keep his military rank.

In 2003, the Spanish justice system sought his extradition in order to stand trial in Spain for crimes against humanity committed during the dictatorship. 
Initially the government of Spanish Prime Minister José María Aznar ruled the extradition inadmissible but, in 2005, the Supreme Court overturned that decision and ordered extradition proceedings to go ahead.

Personal life 
Basilio Arturo Ignacio Lami Dozo was born in the province of Santiago del Estero to immigrants from Syria and Lebanon who had come to the Republic of Argentina before the fall of the Ottoman Empire after the World War. He died on 1 February 2017, on his 88th birthday.

References

External links
"La Corte, contra un pedido de Graffigna y Lami Dozo" Clarín, 13 April 2006

 

1929 births
2017 deaths
Argentine Air Force brigadiers
Argentine people of Lebanese descent
Argentine people of Syrian descent
Argentine military personnel of the Falklands War
Recipients of Argentine presidential pardons